Georgios Zoitakis (January 1910 – 21 October 1996) was a Hellenic Army General and regent of Greece from 13 December 1967 to 21 March 1972, during the period of the military regime of the Colonels.

Life 
Georgios Zoitakis was born in Nafpaktos. He graduated from the Hellenic Military Academy in 1932, and fought in the Greco-Italian War and the Battle of Greece in an Evzone battalion with the rank of lieutenant. During the Axis Occupation of Greece, he joined the EDES guerrillas in his native Aetolia-Acarnania. During the civil conflict between EDES and the leftist EAM-ELAS in late 1943, his father Konstantinos was killed by ELAS fighters. In fall 1944, he too was captured by ELAS and kept prisoner until the Varkiza agreement in spring 1945. He then re-joined the Army, and fought in the Greek Civil War, rising to the rank of major. For his military service, he thrice received, among other awards, Greece's highest medal for bravery, the Gold Cross of Valour, an extremely rare honour.

In the 1950s he attended staff officer courses in the Superior School of War and the School of National Defense in Greece parallel to NATO military seminars in West Germany and in the United States. During this period he served as adjutant to King Pávlos, then Chief of Staff to the First Army as Brigadier, CO of the I Army Corps as Major General and of the III Army Corps in Thessaloniki, then the most important Greek military formation, as lieutenant general. On 21 April 1967, the day of the Colonels' coup, he was in Athens. Like most of the senior military leadership, he was caught by surprise at the events, but he quickly moved to support the coup. On the same day, he was placed as Deputy Minister of National Defence in the new government.

Following the failure of King Constantine II's counter-coup on 13 December 1967 and the subsequent flight of the royal family to Italy, Zoitakis was sworn in as Regent for the absent King. He held this post until 21 March 1972, when he was replaced by the junta's principal leader, Prime Minister Georgios Papadopoulos. At the same time, he was retired from the Army with the rank of full general. On 1 June 1973, Papadopoulos would abolish the monarchy and declare himself President of a new republic.
 
After Greece's return to democracy, in 1975 Zoitakis, along with the other junta leaders, was tried and convicted to life imprisonment for high treason. He remained in prison for 13 years until 1988, when he was released, due to deteriorating health. A pardon plea was rejected in 1991, and he remained confined to his residence in Athens until his death in 1996.

He was married to Sofia Vouranzeri and had a daughter, Vasiliki (Vicky).  

He is buried in the First Cemetery of Athens.

References

1910 births
1996 deaths
20th-century regents of Greece
Hellenic Army generals
National Republican Greek League members
Leaders of the Greek junta
Greek military personnel of World War II
Greek nationalists
Regents of Greece
Recipients of the Cross of Valour (Greece)
People convicted of treason against Greece
Burials at the First Cemetery of Athens
Greek anti-communists
Greek monarchists
People from Nafpaktos